A.P.O. Akratitos Ano Liosia is a Greek football professional club from Ano Liosia, Athens, Greece. They currently play in the Alpha Division of the Football League championship, which is the third level of the Greek football pyramid. They maintain a quite strong academy of youngsters.

History

Akratitos spent their first years in relative obscurity, until they rose from the lower ranks to the top flight under the managership of Giannis Pathiakakis, who died on the pitch during a training session in 2002. The stadium was subsequently named after him.

Akratitos spent 3 consecutive seasons (2001-02 until 2003-04) in the Alpha Ethniki before being relegated in 2004 after losing a relegation match against Ergotelis which took place in Makedonikos Stadium, Thessaloniki.  The following season Akratitos were re-promoted to Alpha Ethniki.

The 2005-06 season was meant to be their last in the Greek top-flight, as they finished last and were relegated again to the Beta Ethniki, but they decided to withdraw from the professional leagues completely and were automatically demoted to the Delta Ethniki.  During that season they also achieved the lowest attendance ever in the Alpha Ethniki, with only 26 spectators watching their home game against Skoda Xanthi.

The team faced another relegation in 2009, when they finished 12th in Group 7 of the Delta Ethniki and got relegated to the local West Attica championships.

European matches
In July 2003 Akratitos took part in the Intertoto Cup. They played against Finnish team AC Allianssi for the second round, using their youth team, and were eliminated.

Stadium
The team is using the Yannis Pathiakakis Stadium as their home ground. Until the death of Giannis Pathiakakis, it was known as Akratitos Stadium. It has a capacity of 4,944.

Honours
Beta Ethniki
Runners-up (2): 2000–01, 2004–05

Notable former players
 Juan José Borrelli
  Martin Zafirov
 Froylan Ledezma
 William Sunsing
 Berny Peña
 Nader El-Sayed
 Laurent Macquet
 Dimitris Papadopoulos
 Viacheslav Khorkin
 Massimo Paganin
 Paolo Vanoli
 Roberto Merino
 Bogdan Stelea
 Lucian Marinescu
 Erik Lincar
 Milan Obradović

References

External links
Official website 
Akratitos Stadium

 
Association football clubs established in 1963
Football clubs in Attica
1963 establishments in Greece
West Attica